Eremo di Santo Spirito a Majella (Italian for Hermitage of Santo Spirito a Majella) is an hermitage located in Roccamorice, Province of Pescara (Abruzzo, Italy).

History

Architecture

References

External links

 

Santo Spirito a Majella
Roccamorice